Completed in 2004, Samir Kassir Square is 815 square meters located in Beirut, Lebanon. Vladimir Djurovic Landscape Architecture was responsible for the design. The square acts as a gateway to Central Beirut. The small square frames two ancient ficus trees which anchor the project. The square's design acts as a green urban oasis in a hectic city. A serene space that reflects memories through its reflection of the skyline. The trees act as shelters from the surrounding context. A raised water feature adjacent to the street physically demarcates the boundaries. Simple in design, the square creates an intimate space for contemplation and relaxation.

References

Buildings and structures in Beirut
Squares in Beirut